The Seventh Seimas of Lithuania was the parliament (Seimas) elected in Lithuania. Elections took place on 20 October 1996, with the second round on 10 November. The Seimas commenced its work on 25 November 1996 and served a four-year term, with the last session on 18 October 2000.

Elections

In the elections in 1996, 70 members of the parliament were elected on proportional party lists and 71 in single member constituencies. Elections took place on 20 October 1996. In those constituencies where no candidate gained a majority of votes on 20 October, a run-off was held on 10 November.

The elections were won by the Homeland Union - Lithuanian Conservative Party, which gained 70 seats, followed by 16 seats won by Lithuanian Christian Democratic Party. Democratic Labour Party of Lithuania, which had decisively won the previous elections, ended up with only 12 seats.

Activities

Vytautas Landsbergis was elected as the Speaker of the Seventh Seimas and served throughout the term.

The Seventh Seimas laid the foundations for parliamentary control in Lithuania. By this term, institution, Special Investigation Service, designed for anticorruption activities, was established. Also amendments of Constitution, which considered Euroatlantic integration, were passed.

The Seimas and the Government also proceeded with the privatization of large public enterprises.

Composition

Parliamentary groups

During the first session of the Seimas the following parliamentary groups were registered: Homeland Union - Lithuanian Conservatives, Christian Democrats, Center, Democratic Labour Party of Lithuania, Social Democrats, Joint Group (Joint Group of the Peasants' party, the Christian Democratic Union and the National Party "Young Lithuania"), Independent Group and the Mixed Group of Members of the Seimas.

Several splits occurred during the term. In late 1998 Laima Andrikienė and Vidmantas Žiemelis were ejected from Homeland Union - Lithuanian Conservatives. They were followed by another 10 parliament members who formed the parliamentary group of Moderate Conservatives in 2000. In the same year, Modern Christian Democrats (4 members) split from the Christian Democrats and Social Democracy 2000s (4 members at the time) split from the Social Democrats. However, similarly to the Sixth Seimas, the Seventh Seimas saw few defections across ideological borders, due to the vast gulf between ruling and opposition parties.

By the end of the term of the Seimas, the following parliamentary groups were active.

Members
A total of 151 members were elected to the Seventh Seimas (Virgilijus Bulovas and Naglis Puteikis were elected but did not take their seats), including 126 men and 25 women. Seimas had 137 members at the end of the term, as no new elections would take place in single-seat constituencies with less than 6 months of the term left.

References

Legal history of Lithuania
1990s in Lithuania
07